In mathematics, the Tits alternative, named for Jacques Tits, is an important theorem about the structure of finitely generated linear groups.

Statement

The theorem, proven by Tits, is stated as follows.

Consequences

A linear group is not amenable if and only if it contains a non-abelian free group (thus the von Neumann conjecture, while not true in general, holds for linear groups).

The Tits alternative is an important ingredient in the proof of Gromov's theorem on groups of polynomial growth. In fact the alternative essentially establishes the result for linear groups (it reduces it to the case of solvable groups, which can be dealt with by elementary means).

Generalizations

In geometric group theory, a group G is said to satisfy the Tits alternative if for every subgroup H of G either H is virtually solvable or H contains a nonabelian free subgroup (in some versions of the definition this condition is only required to be satisfied for all finitely generated subgroups of G).

Examples of groups satisfying the Tits alternative which are either not linear, or at least not known to be linear, are:

Hyperbolic groups
Mapping class groups;
Out(Fn);
Certain groups of birational transformations of algebraic surfaces.

Examples of groups not satisfying the Tits alternative are:

the Grigorchuk group;
Thompson's group F.

Proof

If it is solvable then the group is solvable. If it is noncompact then a ping-pong argument finishes the proof.

Note that the proof of all generalisations above also rests on a ping-pong argument.

References 

Infinite group theory
Geometric group theory
Theorems in group theory